The Ironton Norfolk and Western Depot is a former train station in downtown Ironton, Ohio, United States.  Constructed at the beginning of the twentieth century, it served the transportation needs of its community for more than half a century, and it has been named a historic site because of its place in local history.

History
Ironton and the surrounding Hanging Rock region were once among Ohio's most prominent industrial regions, due to extensive deposits of iron ore that were worked in the region's numerous charcoal-fired blast furnaces.  For part of this period, land transportation in the region was served by the Scioto Valley Railroad, which enabled the Norfolk and Western Railway to gain access to the area in 1881 by purchasing the smaller railroad.  By this time, industry was transitioning away from traditional iron smelting toward more modern methods of steel manufacturing, requiring the construction of improved trackside facilities in Ironton.  As a result, the N&W erected the present station, beginning in 1906 and finishing construction in the following year.  While it was built to furnish transportation for industrial purposes, the station also served the city's ordinary freight and passenger traffic needs.  Trains ceased using the station when it closed in 1969.  Since that time, the depot has been purchased by Ironton's city government, which leases it for commercial purposes; a series of restaurants has operated out of the building since its closure.  In preparation for one such occupant, extensive renovations were performed in 2007, including refinishing of the hardwood floors, repairs to the roof, and replacement of older windows.

Architecture
Built of brick on a brick foundation, the depot is a single-story building with a simple plan: shorter wings radiate out from both sides of the taller central structure. Separate hip roofs cover the central and side sections, except for the section above the main entrance, at which the roofline deviates to provide shelter as far as the edge of the street. Covered with a gabled roof, this extension features a four-pillar facade topped with a pediment and entablature. Elements such as the main entrance combine to make the building a clear example of the Neoclassical style of architecture.

Preservation
In 1978, the Ironton Norfolk and Western Depot was listed on the National Register of Historic Places, qualifying both because of its place in the area's history and because of its historic architecture.  Thirty-one years later, much of downtown Ironton was designated a historic district and listed on the National Register; this zone, the Downtown Ironton Historic District, includes several blocks around the depot's location at the junction of Park Avenue and Bobby Bare Boulevard.

References

Railway stations in the United States opened in 1907
Railway stations closed in 1969
National Register of Historic Places in Lawrence County, Ohio
Former railway stations in Ohio
Ironton, Ohio
Neoclassical architecture in Ohio
Railway stations on the National Register of Historic Places in Ohio
Restaurants in Ohio
Norfolk and Western Railway stations
Steakhouses in the United States
Historic district contributing properties in Ohio